Sven Aspling (1912 – February 2000) was a Swedish social democrat politician who served as the general secretary of the Social Democratic Party and minister of health and social affairs. He was also a long-term member of the Swedish Parliament for the party.

Biography

Aspling was born in Filipstad, Värmland, in 1912. He worked as a sawmill worker. During the period 1937–1942, he was the local editor of Värmland Folkblad in Filipstad. 

In 1942 Aspling came to Falun as the ombudsman of the Social Democratic Party. In this capacity he played a significant role in the transfer of Nordic refugees during World War II. He served as the organizational secretary in the party board between 1946 and 1948. He was the secretary of the party from 1948 to 1962. During his term as the party secretary he launched a magazine in 1953, Aktuellt i Politiken, which is still in circulation. When he was in office he was also appointed a board member to the advertising group, namely Förenade ARE-Bolagen, which was partly owned by the party.

Aspling was a member of the Swedish Parliament for almost three decades, 1956–1985. In 1962 he succeeded Torsten Nilsson as the minister of social affairs, a position he held until 1976. Aspling served in the post in the cabinets led by both Tage Erlander and Olof Palme.

He was awarded the Illis quorum in 1987.

Personal life and death
As of 2011 one of his children, Björn, was a public accountant in Falun. Another, Anders, was the dean of the Swedish Institute of Management in 2010.

Sven Aspling was one of the last persons who called and talked to Prime Minister Olof Palme on the evening of 28 February 1986 shortly before he was assassinated in Stockholm. Aspling was the author of several books, including Med Erlander och Palme (1999). He died at his home in Sundbyberg in February 2000.

References

External links
 

20th-century Swedish journalists
1912 births
2000 deaths
Members of the Riksdag from the Social Democrats
People from Filipstad
Swedish magazine founders
Swedish Ministers for Social Affairs
Members of the Riksdag 1968–1970
Members of the Riksdag 1970–1973
Members of the Riksdag 1974–1976
Members of the Riksdag 1976–1979
Members of the Riksdag 1979–1982
Members of the Riksdag 1982–1985
Recipients of the Illis quorum